Erik de Haan (born 15 May 1964 in Amsterdam) is a Dutch former football player, who played as a goalkeeper. In 1987 European Cup Winners' Cup Final match he was a substitute to Ajax's goalkeeper Stanley Menzo.

External links
Profile

1964 births
Living people
Dutch footballers
SC Telstar players
MVV Maastricht players
AFC Ajax players
Expatriate footballers in Belgium
Association football defenders
Eredivisie players
Eerste Divisie players
Dutch expatriate footballers
Footballers from Amsterdam